In computer science and mathematics, the Josephus problem (or Josephus permutation) is a theoretical problem related to a certain counting-out game.  Such games are used to pick out a person from a group, e.g. eeny, meeny, miny, moe.

In the particular counting-out game that gives rise to the Josephus problem, a number of people are standing in a circle waiting to be executed. Counting begins at a specified point in the circle and proceeds around the circle in a specified direction. After a specified number of people are skipped, the next person is executed. The procedure is repeated with the remaining people, starting with the next person, going in the same direction and skipping the same number of people, until only one person remains, and is freed.

The problem—given the number of people, starting point, direction, and number to be skipped—is to choose the position in the initial circle to avoid execution.

History
The problem is named after Flavius Josephus, a Jewish historian living in the 1st century. According to Josephus' firsthand account of the siege of Yodfat, he and his 40 soldiers were trapped in a cave by Roman soldiers. They chose suicide over capture, and settled on a serial method of committing suicide by drawing lots. Josephus states that by luck or possibly by the hand of God, he and another man remained until the end and surrendered to the Romans rather than killing themselves. This is the story given in Book 3, Chapter 8, part 7 of Josephus' The Jewish War (writing of himself in the third person):

The details of the mechanism used in this feat are rather vague. According to James Dowdy and Michael Mays, in 1612 Claude Gaspard Bachet de Méziriac suggested the specific mechanism of arranging the men in a circle and counting by threes to determine the order of elimination. This story has been often repeated and the specific details vary considerably from source to source. For instance, Israel Nathan Herstein and Irving Kaplansky (1974) have Josephus and 39 comrades stand in a circle with every seventh man eliminated. A history of the problem can be found in S. L. Zabell's Letter to the editor of the Fibonacci Quarterly.

As to intentionality, Josephus asked: “shall we put it down to divine providence or just to luck?”  But a rough draft by Josephus tells a different story: that he “counted the numbers cunningly and so managed to deceive all the others”.  Josephus had an accomplice; the problem was then to find the places of the two last remaining survivors (whose conspiracy would ensure their survival). It is alleged that he placed himself and the other man in the 31st and 16th place respectively (for  = 3 below).

Variants and generalizations

A medieval version of the Josephus problem involves 15 Turks and 15 Christians aboard a ship in a storm which will sink unless half the passengers are thrown overboard. All 30 stand in a circle and every ninth person is to be tossed into the sea. The Christians need to determine where to stand to ensure that only the Turks are tossed. In other versions the roles of Turks and Christians are interchanged.

 describe and study a "standard" variant: Determine where the last survivor stands if there are  people to start and every second person ( = 2 below) is eliminated.

A generalization of this problem is as follows. It is supposed that every th person will be executed from a group of size , in which the th person is the survivor.

Solution

In the following,  denotes the number of people in the initial circle, and  denotes the count for each step, that is,  people are skipped and the -th is executed.

k=2
The problem is explicitly solved when every second person will be killed (every person kills the person on their left or right), i.e. . (For the more general case , a solution is outlined below.)
The solution is expressed recursively. Let  denote the position of the survivor when there are initially  people (and ).
The first time around the circle, all of the even-numbered people die.
The second time around the circle, the new 2nd person dies, then the new 4th person, etc.; it is as though there were no first time around the circle.

If the initial number of people was even, then the person in position  during the second time around the circle was originally in position  (for every choice of ). Let . The person at  who will now survive was originally in position . This yields the recurrence

If the initial number of people was odd, then person 1 can be thought of as dying at the end of the first time around the circle. Again, during the second time around the circle, the new 2nd person dies, then the new 4th person, etc.
In this case, the person in position  was originally in position . This yields the recurrence

This suggests that  is an increasing odd sequence that restarts with  whenever the index n is a power of 2.
It is clear that values in the table satisfy this equation. Or it can be thought that after  people are dead there are only  people and it goes to the th person. This person must be the survivor. So . Below, a proof is given by induction.

The base case  is true.
The cases are considered separately when  is even and when  is odd.

Note that .
 is had where the second equality follows from the induction hypothesis.

Note that .
 is had where the second equality follows from the induction hypothesis. This completes the proof.

 can be solved to get an explicit expression for :

The most elegant form of the answer involves the binary representation of size :  can be obtained by a one-bit left cyclic shift of  itself.

Now if the number is represented in binary format, the first bit denotes  and remaining bits will denote . For example, when , its binary representation is

 n    = 1   0   1   0   0   1
 2m   = 1   0   0   0   0   0
 l    =     0   1   0   0   1
/**
 * @param n the number of people standing in the circle
 * @return the safe position who will survive the execution 
 *   f(N) = 2L + 1 where N =2^M + L and 0 <= L < 2^M
 */
public int getSafePosition(int n) {
	// find value of L for the equation
	int valueOfL = n - Integer.highestOneBit(n);
	return 2 * valueOfL  + 1;
}

Bitwise
The easiest way to find the safe position is by using bitwise operators. In this approach, shifting the most-significant set bit of n to the least significant bit will return the safe position. Input must be a positive integer.

 n    = 1   0   1   0   0   1
 n    = 0   1   0   0   1   1
/**
 * @param n (41) the number of people standing in the circle
 * @return the safe position who will survive the execution 
 */
public int getSafePosition(int n) {
    return ~Integer.highestOneBit(n*2) & ((n<<1) | 1);
    //     ---------------------- ---  | ------------
    //     Get the first set bit   |   | Left Shift n and flipping the last bit
    //    and take its complement  |   |
    //                             |   |
    //                Multiply n by 2  |
    //                         Bitwise And to copy bits exists in both operands.
}

k=3
In 1997, Lorenz Halbeisen and Norbert Hungerbühler discovered a closed-form for the case . They showed that there is a certain constant

that can be computed to arbitrary precision. Given this constant, choose  to be the greatest integer such that  (this will be either  or ). Then, the final survivor is

 if is rounded up else 

for all .

As an example computation, Halbeisen and Hungerbühler give  (which is actually the original formulation of Josephus' problem). They compute:

 and therefore 
 (note that this has been rounded down)

This can be verified by looking at each successive pass on the numbers  through :

The general case
Dynamic programming is used to solve this problem in the general case by performing the first step and then using the solution of the remaining problem. When the index starts from one, then the person at  shifts from the first person is in position , where n is the total number of persons. Let  denote the position of the survivor.

 

which takes the simpler form

 

This approach has running time , but for small  and large  there is another approach. The second approach also uses dynamic programming but has running time . It is based on considering killing k-th, 2k-th, ..., -th people as one step, then changing the numbering.

This improved approach takes the form

References

Citations

Sources

Further reading

 FUN2010

External links
 Josephus Flavius game (Java Applet) at cut-the-knot allowing selection of every nth out of 50 (maximum).
 
 
 Generalized Josephus Problem

Combinatorics
Computational problems
Josephus
Mathematical problems
Permutations